Gauntlet Hair was an American indie rock band from Denver, Colorado, United States. The members consisted of Craig Nice and Andy Rauworth. After releasing two extended plays, they signed to record label Dead Oceans and have released their self-titled debut album.

Biography 
Nice and Rauworth had been playing music together since their freshman year of high school. Previously located in Chicago, they moved to Lafayette to hone their sound, and subsequently relocated to Denver.

In 2011, Gauntlet Hair signed to independent record label Dead Oceans, and started to record their debut LP. Gauntlet Hair was released on October 18, 2011, and has met with mixed to positive reviews.

Gauntlet Hair released their song "My Christ" as a single on January 24, 2012. The "Human Nature" music video was released as a preview to "Stills," their sophomore record (release date July 16, 2013) with the independent record label Dead Oceans. "Human Nature" was also featured in an episode of Showtime's "Shameless". 

On August 12, 2013, the band announced via their Facebook page that they were splitting up, writing "Gauntlet Hair has reached its end. Thank you all for your support these past 4 years. Love, Andy & Craig".

On May 31, 2018, the band announced via their Facebook page that they have started a new project named Cindygod and that new music shall follow. They released their first EP Demos on December 18, 2018.

Past members
Andy Rauworth - vocals, guitar
Craig Nice - drums, percussion

Touring members
Matt Daniels - bass
Nathan Wright - guitar
Brian Brissart - guitar

Discography 
 "I Was Thinking" (single, 2010)
 Out, Don't... (EP, 2010)
 Gauntlet Hair (debut album, 2011)
 Stills (LP, July 16, 2013)

References

External links

American experimental rock groups
Indie rock musical groups from Colorado
Musical groups from Denver
Musical groups established in 2009
Musical groups disestablished in 2013
Noise pop musical groups
Rock music duos
Dead Oceans artists